Legends of Wrestling II is a professional wrestling video game developed by Acclaim Studios Salt Lake City, published by Acclaim Entertainment, and released on November 26, 2002 for both the PlayStation 2 and GameCube. It was later released for the Xbox on December 5, 2002. It is the sequel to the 2001 professional wrestling video game Legends of Wrestling. Legends II contains 25 wrestlers that were not in the first game, though also excludes Rob Van Dam, presumably because he had recently been signed to a WWE contract. The game did contain Eddie Guerrero, however, who, although unemployed at the time, re-signed with WWE when the game was released. The game was also released on the Game Boy Advance on November 25, 2002. It was the last game developed by Acclaim's Salt Lake City studio before its closure in December 2002.

The PlayStation 2 and Xbox versions included video interviews with many of the legends featured in the game while the European version of the game included four exclusive additional legends from the United Kingdom: Kendo Nagasaki, Big Daddy, Mick McManus, and Giant Haystacks.

Gameplay
Within Career Mode, a wrestler will be working for a specific promoter in each area. By winning the belt for that division and successfully defending it, said promoter will become available for purchase in Shop Mode. Note that the world region is only available after completion of all the American territories. Each territory has between 8-12 storylines chosen at random with a push of a button. Certain storylines may not be available based on the wrestler used by the player. For example, if the player uses Jerry Lawler, the only storyline he can play in the Southeast region is based on the famous feud Lawler had with comedian Andy Kaufman.

The game also features a Create A Legend mode (CAL). Players can create their own custom made characters which can be used for storyline mode as well as exhibition play.

Reception

The console versions of the game received "mixed or average" reviews, while the Game Boy Advance version received "generally unfavorable" reviews, according to review aggregator Metacritic. GameSpot nominated Legends of Wrestling II for its 2002 "Worst Game on Game Boy Advance" award, which went to Mortal Kombat Advance.

Sequel

A sequel to the game, titled Showdown: Legends of Wrestling, was released two years later in 2004, for the PlayStation 2 and Xbox.

See also

 List of licensed wrestling video games
 List of fighting games
 Legends of Wrestling (series)
 Legends of Wrestling
 Showdown: Legends of Wrestling

References

External links
 
 

2002 video games
Acclaim Entertainment games
Game Boy Advance games
GameCube games
Legends of Wrestling (series)
PlayStation 2 games
Video game sequels
Video games with custom soundtrack support
Xbox games
Professional wrestling games
Video games based on real people
Cultural depictions of professional wrestlers
Video games developed in the United States
Multiplayer and single-player video games